Philips Memorial Hall is a building of West Chester University, in West Chester, Pennsylvania, United States, named after George Morris Philips (principal from 1881–1920), originally opened in 1927. It is a contributing building in the West Chester State College Quadrangle Historic District listed on the National Register of Historic Places in 1981. Designed by Walter F. Price, the exterior is fashioned from hammer-dressed Foxcroft Wissahickon schist, a local stone commonly used for buildings in the Collegiate Gothic style.

Thanks to the support of Emily Kessel Asplundh '27 and others, preservation and renovations were completed in 1999.  Special features include: the whispering archway; the distinctive gargoyles; coats of arms and figures of western civilization; the 2,000-volume Philips Autographed Library; the 1,200-seat Emily K. Asplundh Concert Hall; and the Presidential office suite.

Gallery

See also
 William L. Price

References

West Chester University
Gothic Revival architecture in Pennsylvania
Buildings and structures completed in 1927
Historic district contributing properties in Pennsylvania
National Register of Historic Places in Chester County, Pennsylvania
University and college buildings on the National Register of Historic Places in Pennsylvania